P&O Ferries is a British shipping company that operates ferries from United Kingdom to Ireland, and to Continental Europe (France and the Netherlands). The company was created in 2002 through mergers and acquisitions within P&O. It has been owned by Dubai-based DP World since 2019.

History

1960s – 1989 
P&O originally established ferry services in the United Kingdom in the late 1960s in the North Sea between Hull and Rotterdam and the English Channel between Southampton and Le Havre. 
In the late 1970s P&O was affected by a reduction in traditional shipping activities which saw the sale of a number of its businesses and assets. This continued into 1985 with the sale of its cross-channel ferry activities to European Ferries, which at the time consisted of services on the Dover–Boulogne and Portsmouth–Le Havre routes the latter having transferred from Southampton in December 1984.

In January the following year, P&O purchased a 50.01% interest in European Financial Holdings Ltd, which held 20.8% of shares in European Ferries, followed in 1987 with the purchase of the remaining shares of the European Ferries Group whose ferry services were trading as Townsend Thoresen. Following the Herald of Free Enterprise disaster in March 1987, the operations of Townsend Thoresen were renamed P&O European Ferries on 22 October 1987, with operations from Portsmouth, Felixstowe and Dover.

1990 – 2019 
Following a consultation with the Competition Commission beginning 28 November 1996, P&O European Ferries split into three separate subsidiaries: P&O Portsmouth, P&O North Sea and the creation of a joint venture between P&O and the Swedish ferry company Stena Line's UK subsidiary Stena Line (UK) Ltd to create P&O Stena Line in Dover.

In April 2002, P&O announced its intention to purchase Stena Line's 40% share of the joint venture. The purchase was completed by August, and in October 2002 the Portsmouth and North Sea operations were merged with the Dover operations to create P&O Ferries Ltd, jointly managing all services from its head office, Channel House in Dover.

In September 2004, P&O Ferries Ltd conducted a business review that concluded with the announcement of closure of several of its long-term Portsmouth-based routes, leaving only the Portsmouth – Bilbao route in operation. These closures were predominantly blamed on the expansion of low-cost airlines and the increasing usage of the Channel Tunnel as a faster alternative to ferry operations.

In 2006, the P&O Group, including P&O Ferries was sold to Dubai-based DP World. Shortly afterwards it was taken over by Dubai World.

On 15 January 2010, P&O Ferries announced that it would be closing the Portsmouth–Bilbao route by the end of September to coincide with the end of its existing charter for Pride of Bilbao. This meant the closure of the final route served by P&O Ferries in Portsmouth.

In January 2019 P&O Ferries announced that its UK fleet would be reflagged from Dover, UK to Limassol, Cyprus in response to the United Kingdom's exit from the European Union in 2019 "For operational and accounting reasons". Cyprus is a member of the EU and a flag of convenience; the reflagging will allow P&O to continue to benefit from EU tax arrangements. According to the Rail, Maritime and Transport union, the reflagging is "pure opportunism", saying that the firm's "long-term aim has always been to switch the UK fleet to a tax haven register".

On 20 February 2019, DP World announced it had repurchased P&O Ferries from Dubai World in a £322m deal.

Since 2020

2022 staff sacking 

On 17 March 2022, P&O abruptly suspended its operations, cancelling all sailings and offloading passengers and cargo. Eight hundred UK staff were told in a video call that their employment was "terminated with immediate effect due to redundancy", and that their work would in future be undertaken by staff contracted to a third-party supplier. Staff on some ferries refused to leave their vessels. A spokesman for the National Union of Rail, Maritime and Transport Workers said that there had been no consultation with the staff or trade unions. The Chair of the Transport Select Committee, Huw Merriman MP, criticised P&O. In the light of this action by P&O Ferries, the UK government stated it will review its contracts with this company. This has resulted in calls to boycott P&O Ferries including by members of the public, businesses in the travel trade and politicians.

The method of the expulsion, overseen by ex-military security guards, has been criticised by several government and business leaders. Mark Russell, a non-executive director of DP World, resigned afterwards in disagreement with the way with which the restructuring was carried out. P&O Ferries has recently seen losses during the COVID-19 pandemic as well as deficits in its pension fund. Industry sources have also cited its high overheads and competition from Irish Ferries as potential contributory factors. Verity Slater, partner and expert in maritime employment law at Stephens Scown, commented that P&O may not have to follow UK employment laws, since some of its ships are not registered in Britain.

On 24 March 2022, P&O Ferries CEO Peter Hebblethwaite confirmed before the Transport Select Committee of MPs that the management of the company acted unlawfully when it fired the crew members without consultation. Grant Shapps said that P&O Ferries should change the names of MS Spirit of Britain, MS Pride of Hull, MS Pride of Kent and MS Pride of Canterbury to remove all British references, were it found that P&O had broken the law.  Shapps confirmed that the ships concerned would only be able to operate following full training and subsequent inspection by the Maritime and Coastguard Agency.

On 24 March Shapps wrote to Hebblethwaite to give him "one final opportunity" to reinstate the 800 workers. On 29 March Hebblethwaite said he would not resign, despite two of the company’s vessels being impounded over safety concerns and said that the company would not reinstate the 800 workers it sacked.

The controversy also caused P&O Cruises, another company originally owned by P&O but which was divested in 2000 and acquired by Carnival Corporation & plc in 2003, to suffer public backlash and to embark on an advertising campaign to clarify their separate ownership from P&O Ferries.

On 25 April, it was reported that P&O Ferries was forced to reverse its attempt at pay cuts for the new workers. National Union of Rail, Maritime and Transport Workers, also known as RMT Union, received reports of seafarers being asked to sign new contracts with reduced payment. Then, the union reported the company to the Maritime and Coastguard Agency, which made sure that the wages were not reduced.

Other brands
Over the years P&O Ferries operated various subsidiary ferry companies, each with their own distinctive name, these included:
 Pandoro Ltd and Ferrymasters Ltd
 P&O Irish Sea
 P&O European Ferries
 P&O Portsmouth
 P&O North Sea Ferries
 P&O Stena Line (joint venture)

Operations
Throughout its history, P&O Ferries has operated in five main areas, centred around Dover, Portsmouth, Southampton, the Irish Sea and the North Sea.

Dover

P&O began ferry operations in Dover in 1976 with a route to Boulogne in France under the Normandy Ferries brand using the ferry MV Lion which had previously served on the former Burns & Laird Line route between Ardrossan and Belfast. Burns & Laird Line was part of the P&O Group at the time. P&O Normandy Ferries eventually supplemented the Dover-Boulogne route with the twin sisters MV Panther and MV Tiger, both former Danish ferries.
The  Dover-Boulogne route was sold to European Ferries on 4 January 1985 which rebranded them, along with its Southampton–Le Havre route, as Normandy Ferries Ltd. Following the purchase of European Ferries, P&O operated routes from Dover to Calais in France and Zeebrugge in Belgium, initially trading under the Townsend Thoresen brand; however, due to the bad publicity that the Herald of Free Enterprise disaster brought to that brand in March 1987, the services were subsequently rebranded to P&O European Ferries, with most vessels named with the prefix Pride of.

Prior to the acquisition, European Ferries had ordered two purpose-built vessels for the Dover–Calais route. P&O's Dover operations remained largely unchanged until 1998 when they were merged with Stena Lines Dover and Newhaven operations to form P&O Stena Line (P&OSL) in response to the increased competition from the Channel Tunnel which opened in 1994 and the coming end to duty-free shopping within the EU in July 1999. As a result, vessels were renamed from the recognisable Pride of prefix to instead be prefixed with P&OSL in 1999. P&OSL operated eleven vessels, eight of which provided a freight and passenger service on the Dover–Calais route and the remaining three a freight service on the Dover–Zeebrugge route.

In August 2002, P&O acquired Stena Line's 40% share of P&OSL, which were re-merged with the Portsmouth and North Sea operations under the P&O Ferries brand. In December 2002, the Dover–Zeebrugge route closed, leaving only the Dover–Calais route remaining. Vessel prefixes were again changed to PO before they were repainted into a new livery and then resuming the use of the Pride of prefix in 2003.

On 8 August 2008, P&O Ferries announced it had placed a €360 million order with STX Europe for two new ships to replace the ageing Pride of Dover and Pride of Calais. They were the first passenger ferries in the world to comply with the new SOLAS "Safe Return to Port" requirements.

Spirit of Britain entered service on 21 January 2011 replacing Pride of Dover, which remained in layup in Tilbury before being sold and scrapped in late 2012. Spirit of France entered service on 9 February 2012. Pride of Calais remained in service primarily as a freight ferry to cope with demand following the collapse of SeaFrance, before being withdrawn on 20 October 2012 and subsequently chartered to TransEuropa Ferries although this charter was somewhat short lived and Pride of Calais subsequently followed her sister, Pride of Dover, to the scrapyard and she was beached in Turkey in late 2013

New hybrid ships with 8.8 MWh battery and 4 7.5 MW motors are planned to enter service (EIS) on the Dover-Calais route by 2023. These ships will be the first double-ended ferries to operate the Dover-Calais service. They will be the world's largest double-ended ferries, with a length of 230 metres, even larger than the Spirit-class ships. On 21 December 2020, it was announced that the keels for the first three ships in the new class were laid, with the following delivery dates scheduled for the first two: 23 September 2022 and 23 March 2023. On 2 January 2022, the first ship of the class was launched and a few days later, the names of the two new ships were announced as P&O Pioneer and P&O Liberte.

Southampton

P&O began ferry operations in Southampton in 1967 with a route to Le Havre in France in a joint venture with SAGA under the Normandy Ferries brand, later rebranded as P&O Ferries. The , owned by P&O, was registered in Southampton whereas her identical sister, flew the French flag and was registered in Le Havre. This route was sold to European Ferries in January 1985 which rebranded them, along with its Dover-Boulogne route, as Townsend Thoresen.

Portsmouth

P&O's Portsmouth operations began with their acquisition of Normandy Ferries' Portsmouth-Le Havre route, branding it as P&O Normandy Ferries and offering a twice-daily service, initially competing with both Brittany Ferries and Townsend Thoresen. In 1985, P&O sold its ferry operations to European Ferries before returning to the market in 1987 with its takeover of European Ferries the same year, this time employing the P&O European Ferries brand.

Following the acquisition in 1987, P&O European Ferries operated routes from Portsmouth to Cherbourg and Le Havre. On the Le Havre route the jumbo 'Super Vikings' Pride of Hampshire and Pride of Le Havre1 initially serviced the route supported at various times by chartered in freight vessels or transferred 'European' class vessels. However, their low capacity meant that by 1991 larger vessels were required; this was eventually solved by the introduction of two German-built vessels, Pride of Le Havre2 and Pride of Portsmouth in 1994.

In 1993 P&O opened a new route from Portsmouth to Bilbao, Spain, using the Pride of Bilbao operating a twice weekly service. This was the longest route that P&O Ferries operated and was often late arriving due to the weather conditions in the Bay of Biscay.

1998 saw the introduction of a new high-speed service on the Portsmouth–Cherbourg route using the Superstar Express, being replaced by the larger Incat-built 91m long Portsmouth Express in 2000. The change to the larger vessel did not go smoothly, and the new ship suffered a number of technical problems, forcing P&O Portsmouth to recall Superstar Express for a short time from its new home on the Cairnryan–Larne route until the problems were solved. Portsmouth Express gained a reputation of being unreliable, and services were frequently cancelled due to technical problems and the weather, but her larger size and long-term charter agreement meant she remained on the service for a number of years. For her 2003 season she was painted in standard P&O Ferries livery and her trading name was shortened to "Express", with her official name becoming Catalonia A. In her final season in 2004, the vessel was officially renamed Express but adopted the trading name Cherbourg Express.

In summer 2004 P&O Ferries operated a Portsmouth–Caen route using the Incat 91 model catamaran Max Mols from Mols-Linien, trading under the name Caen Express. However, this was short lived, with P&O Ferries announcing on 28 September 2004 its planned closure of the Portsmouth–Cherbourg and Caen routes and the transfer of the Portsmouth–Le Havre route to Brittany Ferries due to falling passenger numbers and rising costs. Caen Express was returned to Mols-Linien in October 2004, and the Portsmouth–Cherbourg route closed on 14 January 2005. Following the intervention of the Office of Fair Trading and the Competition Commission, Brittany Ferries backed out of the deal to take over the Le Havre route, so Portsmouth–Le Havre remained under P&O Ferries until its closure on 30 September 2005.

The Bilbao route remained as the only Portsmouth operation, until on 15 January 2010, P&O Ferries announced they would withdraw the service at the end of Pride of Bilbao'''s charter. The vessel completed her final voyage on 28 September 2010 and was returned to Irish Continental Group, from whom she had been chartered since the route's inception. This marked the end of P&O's operations from Portsmouth.

North Sea

P&O's involvement in the North Sea ferry routes began with a 35% stake in North Sea Ferries owned by its subsidiary General Steam Navigation Company. North Sea Ferries had begun operations on 17 December 1965 sailing on the Hull–Rotterdam route, a route which critics predicted would not survive. The numbers proved them wrong, however, and in the first year, 54,000 passengers were carried.

The two vessels  and Norwave were transferred to a new route, Hull–Zeebrugge, operating a nightly service departing 30 minutes after the Rotterdam service sailed. The two routes remained unchanged, with the exception of the Ministry of Defence chartering Norland for service with the British Task Force to the Falkland Islands in 1982.

As part of the success of the routes, dedicated freight routes were introduced from Teesport to both Rotterdam and Zeebrugge on a nightly basis. However, the ships quickly began to struggle to cope with demand, and in 1994 new superfreighters were introduced on the Hull routes.  A new river berth was therefore constructed to accommodate the freight only vessels, however they were still small enough to pass through the lock at King George Dock if required.

By 1996 P&O owned a 50% stake in North Sea Ferries, the other 50% owned by Royal Nedlloyd Group. In a multimillion-pound deal, P&O purchased Royal Nedlloyd Group's stake, and North Sea Ferries was rebranded to P&O North Sea Ferries. Norsea and Norsun were refitted and returned to P&O North Sea Ferries on the Hull–Zeebrugge route as Pride of York and Pride of Bruges.

Following P&O's acquisition of P&O Stena Line in 2002, P&O North Sea Ferries was merged and rebranded with P&O's Portsmouth and Dover operations under the current P&O Ferries Ltd name.

P&O Ferries host many themed minicruises on the Hull to Rotterdam route. These include the now traditional 'Hulloween' minicruise on 28 October and music minicruises with 50s and 60s music.

Irish Sea

In 1971 P&O purchased the remains of Coast Lines which had been operating in the Irish Sea since 1913. In December 1974, P&O founded Pandoro Ltd to provide transport operations to Ireland. A number of different routes were started and ceased operating as the 'Troubles' affected the car/passenger market to Northern Ireland.

In 1993 Pandoro added a service operating between Rosslare, Ireland, and Cherbourg, France, to its Ardrossan–Larne, Liverpool–Dublin and Fleetwood–Dublin routes.

P&O Irish Sea was formed in 1998, following the merger of the Cairnryan-based service of P&O European Ferries (Felixstowe) Ltd and Pandoro Ltd (who operated routes between England, Scotland and France to Ireland). The following year (1999), the new P&O Irish Sea announced its intentions to purchase a purpose-built Ro-Pax (roll-on, roll-off, vehicle/passenger) vessel from Mitsubishi of Japan for the Liverpool to Dublin route. This would see the transfer of European Leader (ex Buffalo) back to the Fleetwood route.

In 2004, P&O closed its Fleetwood – Larne services with the sale of all interests. In addition to the service rights, European Leader, European Pioneer and European Seafarer were sold to the Swedish Stena Line group. At the same time, P&O announced the closure of the Mostyn – Dublin service due to low passenger numbers. This led to the sale of European Ambassador and European Envoy'' for further service in Europe. In 2010, P&O Irish Sea was absorbed back into the parent company.

In January 2016, it was announced that the seasonal Troon to Larne service would cease with immediate effect due to the unprofitability of the route. The service had ended for the 2015 season in September of that year.

Present fleet

Former fleet

Future fleet

Routes
P&O Ferries has operated the following routes:

Passenger / freight routes
Ardrossan–Larne (1970–2001) – transferred to Troon
Dover–Calais – operated by Townsend Thoresen until 1987
Dover–Boulogne (1965–1993)
Dover–Zeebrugge (1987–1991) – operated by Townsend Thoresen until 1987
Dublin-Cherbourg (2002–2004)
Felixstowe-Zeebrugge (1987–2002) – operated by Townsend Thoresen until 1987
Felixstowe-Rotterdam (1987–2002) – transferred to Stena Line
Fleetwood–Larne (1973–2004) – transferred to Stena Line
Hull–Rotterdam – operated by North Sea Ferries until 1997
Hull–Zeebrugge – ceased at end of 2020 season due to unprofitability 
Larne–Cairnryan – operated by Townsend Thoresen until 1987
Larne–Troon (2001–2015) – ceased at end of 2015 season due to unprofitability
Liverpool–Belfast (1971–1981) 
Liverpool–Dublin – operated by B&I Line until 1975
Middlesbrough-Gothenburg (1981–2001)
Mostyn–Dublin (2001–2004)
Portsmouth–Cherbourg (1987–2005) – operated by Townsend Thoresen until 1987
Portsmouth–Le Havre (1987–2005) –             "                            "
Portsmouth–Caen (2004)
Portsmouth–Bilbao (1993–2010)
Rosslare–Cherbourg (1993–2005) – transferred to Celtic Link Ferries
Southampton–Le Havre (1967–1985) – transferred to Normandy Ferries Ltd

Freight-only routes
 Dover–Zeebrugge (1991–2002)
 Teesport–Rotterdam
 Teesport–Zeebrugge
 Tilbury–Zeebrugge
 Calais-Tilbury

References

Notes

Bibliography

External links

 Official P&O Ferries website
 Swedish website
 P&O Ferries Freight Site

P&O (company)
DP World
Ferry companies of Belgium
Ferry companies of England
Ferry companies of France
Ferry companies of Ireland
Ferry companies of the Netherlands
Ferry companies of Northern Ireland
Ferry companies of Scotland
Ferry companies of Spain
Connections across the English Channel
British brands